Wei Ziya (usually referred to in the media as Ziya Wei; born October 1984) is a Chinese beauty contestant and winner of Miss China Universe 2007. Wei represented China in Miss Universe 2008 in Vietnam, but was unplaced.

1984 births
Living people
Chinese beauty pageant winners
Miss Universe 2008 contestants
People from Guiyang